Olly the Little White Van is a children's CGI television series from the United Kingdom, created by Henry Becket. Original episodes have aired on CITV, Channel 5 and Cartoonito.

The series has 5-minute long episodes and 11-minute long episodes, and is syndicated in multiple countries, including Turkey, Russia and the UAE.

Characters
Olly
Bazza
Ivan
Jethro
Royston
Bessie
Suzy
Quentin
Bertie
Stan
Alice
Mick
Dylan
Mohammed
Farmer Dan
Mario
Miss Florette
Percy
Professor Claxon
Max
Tasha
Ruby
Sir Ronald Grump
Milford
Charlie
Tommy
Sandy
Dirk 
Ronnie
Donnie
Unnamed forklift

Episodes

Season 1
 Roadside Cafe
 Driving School
 My Favourite Flavour
 Rock N Roll
 Best in Show
 Olly Cleans Up
 Bird Watching
 Bumpton Rally
 Olly the Cat
 Shady Lane
 The Grand Unveiling
 Catch Me if You Can
 Zoo Hill

Season 2
 A Giant Leap For Vankind
 Ruby's Rescue
 Olly the Chauffeur
 Dancing on Ice
 Turbo Bertie
 Nothing to Worry About
 The Wonderful Washer
 Ivan and Mario: The Musical
 The Bumpton Cup
 Back to School
 Radio Olly
 Bumpton in Bloom
 Olly the Artist

Season 3
 Olly's Treasure Hunt
 Tractor Trouble
 Crazy Golf
 Olly the Little Red Firevan
 Olly the Magician
 High Revs
 Get Up and Dance
 The Bumpton Incident
 Olly Vanquish
 To Catch a Thief
 Olly the Detective
 Olly the Little Stinker
 The Road to Recovery

Season 4
 Laundryman And The Wheeled Wonder
 What's In The Box
 Ivan Has The Hiccups
 A Very Olly Christmas
 Olly The Inventor
 Handle with Care
 Bumpton Day Big Band
 Bertie's New Glasses
 Valentine's Day
 Betsy the Bumper Car
 Meals on Wheels
 The Driving Test
 Zookeeper Olly

Season 5
 Suzy's Makeover
 Skyscraper Caper!
 Bumpton Buses
 The Mystery of the Bumpton Ghost
 Duck and Cover
 The Audition
 Bad Luck Olly
 Train Trouble
 Just the Ticket!
 Hired and Fired
 Bridge Builder Olly
 Olly at Sea
 Birthday Bazza

Season 6 (FINAL SEASON)
 Olly's Room
 Strictly Bumpton
 Who's Olly?
 The Olly Stuff
 A Hard Day's Knight
 Bumpton's Strongest Van
 Close Encounters of the Olly Kind
 Big Business
 Bumpton's Bestest Bakers
 Where's Olly?
 Christmas Lights Switch On
 Farmer Of The Year
 The Monster of Bumpton Loch

References

External links
Olly the Little White Van website (Flash required)

2010s British children's television series
2010s British animated television series
2011 British television series debuts
British computer-animated television series
British children's animated adventure television series
British preschool education television series
ITV children's television shows
Animated preschool education television series
2010s preschool education television series
Animated television series about children
English-language television shows